Hanaford Valley is a valley in the U.S. state of Washington.

Hanaford Valley has the name of Theophilus G. and Lucy Hapwood Hanaford, pioneer citizens.

References

Landforms of Lewis County, Washington
Landforms of Thurston County, Washington
Valleys of Washington (state)